was a Thresher/Permit-class nuclear submarine known as the "Goal Keeper" or the "Black Cat." She was the second United States Navy ship named after the gato, a species of small catshark found in waters along the west coast of Mexico.

The contract to build her was awarded to the Electric Boat Division of General Dynamics Corporation on 9 July 1960 and her keel was laid down on 15 December 1961 at Groton, Connecticut.  She was launched 14 May 1964 sponsored by Mrs. Lawson P. Ramage, and was commissioned 25 January 1968 under the command of CDR Albert Baciocco.

The impact completely destroyed the K-19s bow sonar systems and mangled the covers of its forward torpedo tubes. K-19 returned to port for repair but the Gato was relatively undamaged and continued her patrol.

She was the first nuclear-powered submarine to completely circumnavigate South America, and the first nuclear-powered submarine to navigate the Strait of Magellan during its 1976 Unitas run under the command of CDR Robert Partlow. It was on this voyage that it became the first nuclear submarine to travel through the Panama Canal.

Gato was decommissioned and stricken on 25 April 1996 and disposed of by submarine recycling.

References

External links 

  history.navy.mil: USS Gato
    navsource.org: USS Gato
    hazegray.org: USS Gato
Gato Web site: USS Gato

Permit-class submarines
Cold War submarines of the United States
Nuclear submarines of the United States Navy
Barents Sea
Maritime incidents in 1969
Ships built in Groton, Connecticut
1964 ships